The 2022 Parma Challenger was a professional tennis tournament played on clay courts. It was the first edition of the tournament which was part of the 2022 ATP Challenger Tour. It took place in Parma, Italy between 3 and 9 October 2022.

Singles main-draw entrants

Seeds

 1 Rankings are as of 26 September 2022.

Other entrants
The following players received wildcards into the singles main draw:
  Federico Arnaboldi
  Gianmarco Ferrari
  Gian Marco Moroni

The following player received entry into the singles main draw as a special exempt:
  Luca Van Assche

The following players received entry into the singles main draw as alternates:
  Nicholas David Ionel
  Timofey Skatov

The following players received entry from the qualifying draw:
  Francesco Forti
  Stefano Napolitano
  Oleksandr Ovcharenko
  Oriol Roca Batalla
  Fausto Tabacco
  Máté Valkusz

The following player received entry as a lucky loser:
  Lucas Gerch

Champions

Singles

  Timofey Skatov def.  Jozef Kovalík 7–5, 6–7(2–7), 6–4.

Doubles

  Tomislav Brkić /  Nikola Ćaćić def.  Luis David Martínez /  Igor Zelenay 6–2, 6–2.

References

2022 ATP Challenger Tour
2022 in Italian tennis
October 2022 sports events in Italy